Hrushevsky Street is a street name mostly in Ukraine commemorated to Mykhailo Hrushevsky

It may refer to:

 Hrushevsky Street (Kyiv)
 Hrushevsky Street (Ivano-Frankivsk)